Events in the year 2005 in Ukraine.

Incumbents 

 President: Leonid Kuchma (until 23 January), Viktor Yushchenko (from 23 January)
 Prime Minister: Viktor Yanukovych (until 5 January), Mykola Azarov (from 5 January until 24 January), Yulia Tymoshenko (from 24 January until 8 September), Yuriy Yekhanurov (from 8 September)

Events 

 19 – 20 November – The 2005 European U23 Judo Championships was held in Kyiv.

Deaths 

Yuri Kravchenko, 53, Ukrainian General of Internal Service and statesman, former interior minister of Ukraine.
Stepan Senchuk, 50, Ukrainian politician, former governor of Lviv Oblast, homicide by gunshot.

References 

 
Ukraine
Ukraine
2000s in Ukraine
Years of the 21st century in Ukraine